The seven basic tools of quality are a fixed set of visual exercises identified as being most helpful in troubleshooting issues related to quality. They are called basic because they are suitable for people with little formal training in statistics and because they can be used to solve the vast majority of quality-related issues.

Overview
The seven tools are:
Cause-and-effect diagram (also known as the "fishbone diagram" or Ishikawa diagram)
Check sheet
Control chart
Histogram
Pareto chart
Scatter diagram
Stratification (alternatively, flow chart or run chart)

The designation arose in postwar Japan, inspired by the seven famous weapons of Benkei. It was possibly introduced by Kaoru Ishikawa who in turn was influenced by a series of lectures W. Edwards Deming had given to Japanese engineers and scientists in 1950. At that time, companies that had set about training their workforces in statistical quality control found that the complexity of the subject intimidated most of their workers and scaled back training to focus primarily on simpler methods which suffice for most quality-related issues. The Project Management Institute references the seven basic tools in A Guide to the Project Management Body of Knowledge as an example of a set of general tools useful for planning or controlling project quality.

The seven basic tools stand in contrast to more advanced statistical methods such as survey sampling, acceptance sampling, statistical hypothesis testing, design of experiments, multivariate analysis, and various methods developed in the field of operations research.

See also

References

Footnotes

Bibliography

 
 
 
 
 
 

Quality control tools
Quality